Chicago Police Dept. v. Mosley, 408 U.S. 92 (1972), was a United States Supreme Court case which concerned freedom of speech under the First Amendment. Oral argument for this case  was consolidated with Grayned v. City of Rockford, but separate opinions were issued for each. Earl Mosley had protested employment discrimination by carrying a sign on the sidewalk in front of a Chicago high school, until the city of Chicago made it illegal to do so. Although Chicago believed that its ordinance was a time, place, or manner restriction, and therefore was a constitutional law, the Supreme Court ruled that it was a content-based restriction, because it treated labor-related protests differently from other protests. Since the ordinance did not meet the higher standards for content-based restrictions, it was ruled unconstitutional.

Background

Factual background 
Over the course of seven months in 1967 and 1968, Earl Mosley had frequently picketed the Jones Commercial High School in Chicago with a sign that read: "Jones High School practices black discrimination. Jones High School has a black quota." As the city of Chicago would admit during litigation, Mosley's protests were "always peaceful, orderly, and quiet." Still, effective April 5, 1968, Chicago amended its disorderly conduct ordinance in a way that outlawed his protests:

When he saw a notice of the ordinance in a newspaper, Mosley called the police department, who advised him that he'd be arrested if he kept up his protest. Mosley did stop protesting, but he filed a lawsuit in federal court in the Northern District of Illinois to overturn the ordinance.

Proceedings in lower courts 
The trial court sided with the city and issued a directed verdict upholding the ordinance, reasoning that it met the standards for a time, place, or manner restriction. On appeal, however, the Seventh Circuit ruled that it was overbroad. Because the law could apply to circumstances where the city had not demonstrated any real reason to prohibit all peaceful protests (such as Mr. Mosley's), it prohibited speech more broadly than the constitution would allow:

Chicago appealed the ruling to the U.S. Supreme Court.

Consolidation with Grayned v. City of Rockford 
The same year, the U.S. Supreme Court also accepted an appeal from the Illinois Supreme Court in Grayned v. City of Rockford. In that case, the Illinois Supreme Court had upheld two of Rockford's ordinances; one was an anti-noise ordinance, and the other an anti-picketing ordinance that was identical to Chicago's ordinance.

Decision
The Supreme Court unanimously upheld the Seventh Circuit's decision, holding that the ordinance was unconstitutional. Six justices supported the majority opinion, two concurred without writing or joining an opinion, and Chief Justice Burger wrote a separate concurrence.

Majority opinion 
In an opinion by Justice Thurgood Marshall, the Court ruled that the Chicago's ordinance prohibiting non-labor pickets on school property violated the First Amendment's Freedom to Protest, as well as the Fourteenth Amendment of equal protection under the law. While some of oral argument focused on whether different possible variations on the ordinance–such as whether a radius smaller than 150 feet would be acceptable, or whether the ordinance could affect just school property as opposed to "a public way" outside–the opinion ultimately focused on the fact that labor disputes were treated differently from any other type of speech. That meant the Court had to consider whether it violated the Equal Protection clause, and it found that it did:

This opinion contains what would become an often-quoted statement about the First Amendment's strong protection for free speech:

Burger's concurrence 
Chief Justice Warren Burger wrote a short concurrence in order to state that, although he agreed with the majority on this case's outcome, "the First Amendment does not literally mean that we 'are guaranteed the right to express any thought...'"

References

External links 
 

United States equal protection case law
United States Free Speech Clause case law
United States Supreme Court cases
United States Supreme Court cases of the Burger Court
1972 in United States case law
Chicago Police Department
Chicago Public Schools
Thurgood Marshall